Brusqeulia atrocentra is a species of moth of the family Tortricidae. It is found in Minas Gerais, Brazil.

The wingspan is about 13 mm. The ground colour of the forewings is olive cream sprinkled with brownish cream. The hindwings are pale brownish cream, but paler basally.

Etymology
The specific name refers to the presence of the black dot at the end of the forewing median cell and is derived from Latin ater (meaning black) and centrum (meaning centre).

References

Moths described in 2011
Brusqeulia
Moths of South America
Taxa named by Józef Razowski